Scollard is a locality in central Alberta, Canada within the County of Stettler No. 6.

The locality is within census division No. 7 and the federal riding of Crowfoot.

See also 
List of communities in Alberta

References

External links 
Our Roots: Canada's Local Histories Online - Pioneer Days : Scollard, Rumsey, Rowley

Localities in the County of Stettler No. 6